Frank R. Gaynor (September 2, 1852 – August 2, 1920) was a justice of the Iowa Supreme Court from January 1, 1913, to August 2, 1920, appointed from Plymouth County.

Biography
Frank R. Gaynor was born in Hamilton, Ontario on September 2, 1852. He earned a law degree from the State University of Iowa in 1877.

He married Anna C. Judd in Iowa City on November 29, 1887. They had one daughter.

He was a district court judge before being elected to the state Supreme Court on November 5, 1912. He was a Republican.

Frank R. Gaynor died from heart disease at his home in Des Moines on August 2, 1920.

References

External links

1852 births
1920 deaths
Iowa Republicans
Justices of the Iowa Supreme Court
People from Hamilton, Ontario
University of Iowa alumni